Modern pentathlon is a sport contested at the Summer Olympic Games.

History

Development as an Olympic sport 
Modern pentathlon was created by the founder of the modern Games, Baron Pierre de Coubertin, and was first contested in 1912. Coubertin was inspired by the pentathlon event in Ancient Olympic Games, which was modeled after the skills of the ideal soldier at the time. Modern pentathlon was also influenced by the tradition of civilian and military multi-sport events in Sweden at the beginning of the 20th century. It combined events that were considered to be of upper-class origin like épée fencing, pistol shooting and riding with more popular ones like running and swimming.

The five events making up modern pentathlon are (as of 2021):
épée fencing
200 metre freestyle swimming
show jumping with an unfamiliar horse
3 km cross country running
pistol shooting (as laser pistol shooting in an combined event with running)

After more than half a century of relative stability, modern pentathlon has been the subject of numerous changes since the 1980s with its place on the Olympic programme in question several times.

Beginning at the 1996 Summer Olympics, the five components were held on a single day instead of five. The same year, the Men's team competition was dropped from the Olympics. The women's event was first introduced at the 2000 Summer Olympics. 
Since the 2008 Summer Olympics, the air-pistol shooting is held during the 3 km run. Since the 2012 Summer Olympics, shooting is done using a laser gun, and running and shooting was combined as one event.

Modern pentathlon was still criticized as outdated and lacking popularity in the 2010s. The Associated Press reported in 2013 that the International Olympic Committee was considering dropping it from the Olympics. In response to the criticism, the sport's governing body, the UIPM, made changes to the sport, including by having all five contests held in a single stadium. It was planned for the 2016 Summer Olympics but held for the first time at the 2020 Summer Olympics.

The events of modern pentathlon at the Olympic Games were as follows:

Horse riding
The horse riding event in modern pentathlon has been debated - for different reasons - since the invention of the sport. Coubertin and the organisers of the 1912 Summer Olympics had different views on the availability of horses: Coubertin wanted randomly assigned horses provided by the hosts while the Swedish committee preferred that the competitors bring their own horses.

For the 1988 Summer Olympics cross-country riding was changed to show jumping.

In November 2021, UIPM announced that show jumping would not be a part of the Olympic modern pentathlon starting from the 2028 Summer Olympics, which was connected to an incident in the 2020 Games where German women's coach Kim Raisner had punched pentathlete Annika Schleu's horse. In response, 650 pentathletes put their names on a letter criticizing the lack of collaboration with them and asking for UIPM executives to resign, with UIPM stating it will discuss the matter with them.

Events
Modern pentathlon has been on the Olympic program continuously since 1912.  A women's event was not included until the 2000 Games.

Medal table
Sources:

Nations and number of national participants

See also
List of Olympic venues in modern pentathlon

References

Sandra Heck (2013) Modern Pentathlon at the London 2012 Olympics: Between Traditional Heritage and Modern Changes for Survival, The International Journal of the History of Sport, 30:7, 719-735, 
Sandra Heck: Von Spielenden Soldaten und kämpfenden Athleten. Die Genese des Modernen Fünfkampfes. Göttingen: V & R Unipress. 2013, 
Heck, Sandra. "Making Debrouillards: the modern pentathlon and the pursuit of completeness." Olympika: The International Journal of Olympic Studies, vol. 19, 2010, p. 139+. Gale Academic Onefile, Accessed 27 Sept. 2019.

External links

 
Sports at the Summer Olympics
Modern pentathlon at multi-sport events